Lakshmi Shruti Settipalli (born 12 June 1996) is an Indian Squash player who has won many titles at both national and international levels. She has played professional squash from the age of 17 and held a world ranking of 145 as of August 2013.

Lakshmi Shruti is born on 12 June 1996 in Chennai, and started playing squash at the age of 12. Her parents are Suresh and Vaishnevi Settipalli. She started her squash career at Madras Cricket Club and then moved her training to the ICL-TNSRA squash academy in Chennai under the national coach, Cyrus Poncha. Shruti is a student of the Lady Andal School. She has been awarded the "Athlete of the Year" prize for her performances in national and international squash tournaments. She won a gold in the team category at the All India Punj Lloyds tournament held in Delhi.

Reaching a career high of 30 in European Circuit in 2012, Shruti is the first Indian to win a silver in the Slovak Junior Open. She also won the bronze medal in the Finland Junior Open. Her other achievements include winning the gold medal in the Chennai Junior Open and silver in the AP Open. She finished in the top 5 in the Australian Junior Open, Spanish Junior Open, and Indian Junior Open.
She entered the Professional Squash Association at a young age of 17 and reached her career high of 145 within a year. Later she moved to the United States of America where she completed her graduation from The George Washington University in Washington D.C. She has been a varsity player at the university while pursuing a degree in Organizational Sciences.

References

https://archive.today/20131017095914/http://www.dc-epaper.com/PUBLICATIONS/DC/DCC/2013/10/17/ArticleHtmls/I-WANT-TO-BE-THE-BEST-17102013112003.shtml?Mode=1
https://psaworldtour.com/players/view/8053?tab=info
http://www.squashinfo.com/rankings/9396-lakshmi-shruti-settipalli
https://www.facebook.com/lakshmishrutisettipalli/photos/rpp.655113281187072/2393905813974468/?type=3&theater
http://www.tupaki.com/movienews/article/Watched-Businessman-150-times--Lakshmi-Shruti-Settipalli/54030
https://archive.today/http://www.dc-epaper.com//PUBLICATIONS/DC/DCC/2013/10/17/ArticleHtmls/DIFFERENT-STROKES-17102013101004.shtml?Mode=1http://archive.today/GrF4Mhttp://archive.today/http://www.dc-epaper.com/PUBLICATIONS/DC/DCC/2013/10/17/ArticleHtmls/I-WANT-TO-BE-THE-BEST-17102013112003.shtml?Mode=1

External links
 https://www.youtube.com/watch?v=SvC4OcZag2g
 
 https://www.star-news.org/lakshmi-shruti-settipalli-net-worth-2019
 http://ispsquash.com/Newsletter/NLImages/prosquash69.pdf

Living people
Indian female squash players
Sportswomen from Tamil Nadu
Cricketers from Chennai
1996 births